Neil Shubin (born December 22, 1960) is an American paleontologist, evolutionary biologist and popular science writer.  He is the Robert R. Bensley Professor of Organismal Biology and Anatomy, Associate Dean of Organismal Biology and Anatomy and Professor on the Committee of Evolutionary Biology at the University of Chicago along with being the Provost of the Field Museum of Natural History. He is best known for his co-discovery of Tiktaalik roseae with Ted Daeschler and Farish Jenkins.

Biography
Raised in Overbrook Hills section of Lower Merion Township (contiguous to City of Philadelphia) and a graduate of Lower Merion High School, Shubin earned a A.B. from Columbia College of Columbia University in 1982 and a Ph.D. in organismic and evolutionary biology from Harvard University in 1987. He also studied at the University of California, Berkeley.

Shubin was elected to the National Academy of Sciences in 2011.

Shubin was ABC News' "Person of the Week" in April 2006 when Tiktaalik was unveiled, and made appearances on The Colbert Report January 14, 2008 and January 9, 2013.

The Communication Awards of the National Academies of Sciences, Engineering, and Medicine awarded a $20,000 prize for excellence in communicating science to the general public to Michael Rosenfeld, David Dugan, and Neil Shubin in Film/Radio/TV on October 14, 2015, for Your Inner Fish. The awards are given to individuals in four categories: books, film/radio/TV, magazine/newspaper and online, and are supported by the W. M. Keck Foundation. Neil Shubin hosted Your Inner Fish on PBS. The show was produced by Windfall Films and Tangled Bank Studios, a production company for the Howard Hughes Medical Institute that makes materials available for science classroom education.

He was elected to the American Philosophical Society in 2017. He also served as interim co-director of the Marine Biological Laboratory in 2017.

Awards and honors
In 2019, Shubin was named the recipient of the Roy Chapman Andrews Society Distinguished Explorer Award. Shubin was chosen primarily because of his discoveries to understand the origin of organs in the human body and the connectiveness of all life.

Publications
 Your Inner Fish: A Journey Into the 3.5-Billion-Year History of the Human Body. New York: Pantheon Books, 2008. 
 The Universe Within: Discovering the Common History of Rocks, Planets, and People. Pantheon Books, New York City 2013. 
 Some Assembly Required: Decoding Four Billion Years of Life, from Ancient Fossils to DNA. New York: Pantheon Books, 2020.

References

External links

 Online reading group discussion of Neil Shubin's "Your Inner Fish"
 Video (and audio) of interview/discussion about "Wet Paleontology" with Neil Shubin and Carl Zimmer on Bloggingheads.tv
 
 Neil Shubin on The Colbert Report. Jan 14, 2008
 
PBS website for 'Your Inner Fish' series

20th-century American biologists
American paleontologists
American science writers
Columbia College (New York) alumni
Evolutionary biologists
Harvard University alumni
University of California, Berkeley alumni
University of Chicago faculty
University of Pennsylvania faculty
University of Pennsylvania Department of Biology faculty
1960 births
Living people
Place of birth missing (living people)
21st-century American scientists
Fellows of the American Academy of Arts and Sciences
Fellows of the American Association for the Advancement of Science
Members of the United States National Academy of Sciences
Members of the American Philosophical Society
People associated with the Field Museum of Natural History